The Danish Constituent Assembly is the name given to the 1848 Constitutional assembly at Christiansborg Palace in Copenhagen that approved the Danish Constitution and formalized the transition from absolute monarchy to constitutional democracy. It consisted of members of which 114 were elected by the people, 38 were appointed by the king and the rest were government ministers.

The Danish Constituent Assembly first met on 23 October 1848.

List of members

Copenhagen 
 Martin Hammerich, scholar and educator
 Hans Peter Hansen, Bank of Denmark director
 Anders Sandøe Ørsted, jurist
 , procurator-general
 William Frederik Duntzfelt, merchant and councilman
 , parish priest
 , professor
 , master carpenter 
 , professor
 Lauritz Nicolai Hvidt, merchant
 Nicolai Elias Tuxen, military officer

Copenhagen County 
 Frederiksberg: Carl Christian Hall, chief auditor
 Kongens Lyngby: , educator (replaced , merchant, after the initial election was declared invalid) 
 Roskilde Kro: Carl Wilhelm Thalbitzer, landowner
 Køge: Andreas Frederik Krieger, professor
 Roskilde: , parish priest
 Blæsenborg: , farmer

Frederiksborg County 
 Helsingør: , town bailiff
 Esrum: Johan Christian Drewsen, industrialist
 Ramløse: Edouard Buntzen, attorney
 Frederikssund: Rasmus Nielsen Møller, crofter
 Slangerup: , farmer and parish bailiff
 Hillerød: Johannes Andreas Ostermann, teacher

Holbæk County 
 Holbæk: Niels Ludvig Westergaard, professor
 Tvede Kro: , copyholder
 Vedby Kro: , teacher
 Kalundborg: , captain
 Faurbo Kro: N.H. Nielsen, farmer
 Nykøbing Sjælland: Nicolai Andreasen, miller

Sorø County 
 Ringsted: , copyholder
 Sorø: Carl Emil Mundt, scholar
 Holløse: , theologian
 Skælskør: Christen Christensen Møller, institution manager
 Slagelse: Carl de Neergaard, landowner
 Korsør: , parish priest

Præstø County 
 Store Heddinge: , farmer
 Rønnede: Frederik Johannsen, miller
 Vallø: , jurist
 Præstø: , weaver (replaced by N.F.S. Grundtvig, priest)
 Vordingborg: , farmer
 Næstved: , farmer and parish bailiff
 Stege: , student

Odense County 
 Odense: , teacher
 Højby: , farmer
 Vissenbjerg: , farmer
 Assens: Hans Dinesen, farmer
 Middelfart: , parish priest
 Bogense: , procurator
 Søndersø: , farmer
 Kerteminde: , copyholder

Svendborg County 
 Rudkøbing: , teacher
 Tranekær: , farmer
 Svendborg: , medical doctor
 Nyborg: , educator
 Kværndrup: , farmer
 Korinth Kro: , farmer
 Sønder Bråby: Knud Christian Høier, copyholder

Maribo County 
 Nakskov: Balthazar Christensen, lawyer
 Juellinge: Christen Blach, farmer
 Maribo: , prokurator
 Sakskøbing: Hans Olesen, farmer
 Nykøbing Falster: 
 Stubbekøbing: Hans Rasmussen, farmer

Bornholms County 
 Rønne: A.S. Stender, jurist
 Aakirkeby: Johan Nicolai Madvig, professor (replaced by J.W. Marckmann after being appointed as government minister)

Aalborg County 
 Nørresundby: Anders Jensen Hjort, estate manager
Aalborg: , parish priest
 Bælum: Anders Jungersen, teacher
 Brorstrup: Christen Eriksen, farmer
 Nibe: ,

Hjørring County 
 Frederikshavn: Severin Hastrup, farmer
 Sæby: Hans Peter Theilmann, estate manager
 Hjørring: , landowner
 Jerslev: , landowner
 Vrejlev: Ludvig Christian Brinck-Seidelin, landowner
 Halvrimmen: Johan Nicolai Frederik Hasselbalch, farmer

Thisted County 
 Bjerget: Ulrik Christian Frederik Aagaard, county manager
 Thisted: , agent
 Vestervig: Frederik Christian von Haven, parish priest
 Nykøbing Mors: , parish priest

Viborg County 
 Skive: , farmer
 Viborg: , 
 Levring: Mads Pagh Bruun, industrialist
 Søndervinge: , farmer
 Løvel: ,

Aarhus County 
 Odder: , magister
 Aarhus: , bank teller
 Skjoldelev: ,  and landowner

Skanderborg County 
 Horsens: , mayor
 Skanderborg: , oil miller
 Bræstrup: Niels Hunderup, bailiff
 Linå: , industrialist

Randers County 
 Mariager: Joakim Frederik Schouw, professor
 Randers: , teacher
 Estrup: , auditor
 Grenaa: Peter Christian la Cour, priest
 Ebeltoft: Peter Daniel Bruun, Supreme Court justice
 Voldum: , editor and merchant

Vejle County 
 Fredericia: Peter Georg Bang, amtmand (replaced by Peter Carl Christian Holck after being appointed as government minister)
 Kolding: Carl Ploug, editor
 Vejle: , bailiff
 Give: Anders Hermansen, farmer
 Konstantia: , politician
 Bjerre: , bailiff

Ringkjøbing County 
 Ringkøbing: , landowner
 Lemvig: , farmer
 Holstebro: , bailiff
 Herning: Jens Fløe, diocesan inspector
 Skjern: Jens Petersen, teacher

Ribe County 
 Varde: Christopher Leberecht Tobiesen, provost
 Hjerting: Hans Christian Nielsen, farmer
 Ribe: Peter Hansen Tvede, procurator
 Steensvanggård: Niels Hansen, teacher
 Bredebro: , priest

Members appointed by the king 
 Carl Christopher Georg Andræ, military officer
 Hans Peter Bergmann, veterinarian
 , professor
 Hans Brøchner Bruun, merchant
 Preben Lihme Brandt, textile manufacturer
 S.A.M. Buchwald, merchant
 , 
 , gunsmith
 , farmer
 Henrik Nicolai Clausen, professor (replaced by Frederik Markus Knuth after he was appointed as government minister)
 , professor
 Carl Edvard van Dockum, naval officer (later Christian Albrecht Bluhme)
 , military officer
 , tobacco manufacturer
 Hother Hage, jurist
 , chamberlain
 , councilman
 Mathias Lüttichau, chamberlain
 , Bishop of Ribe
 Jacob Peter Mynster, Bishop of Zealand
 Niels Ostenfeldt, hospital director
 , military officer
 Børge Petersen, hatter
 Peder Brønnum Scavenius, landowner
 Carl Otto Emil Schlegel, military officer
 Knud Sidenius, merchant
 , chamberlain
 Wilhelm Carl Eppingen Sponneck (replaced Anton Frederik Tscherning after he was appointed as government minister)
 Frederik Treschow, 
 Frederik Wulff, city treasurer
 , baron
 , secretary archivist
 Jon Gudmundson, student (Iceland)
 Konráð Gíslason, educator (Iceland)
 Jon Johnsen, byfoged (Iceland)
 Brynjolf Pjeturson,  (Iceland)
 Jón Sigurðsson,  (Iceland)
 Christian Pløyen, amtmand (Faroe Islands)

Ministers of the March Cabinet and November Cabinet 
 Carl Emil Bardenfleth, Minister of Justice
 Christian Frederik Hansen, Minister of War
 Adam Wilhelm Moltke, Prime Minister
 Ditlev Gothard Monrad, Kultus Minister
 , Minister for Schleswig
 , Minister of the Navy

References 

 
1848 in Denmark
Political history of Denmark
Constituent assemblies